The Waverly-Shell Rock Community School District is a rural public school district located in the communities of Waverly and Shell Rock in the northeastern region of the U.S. state of Iowa. The district spans  Bremer, Butler and Black Hawk counties.  There are seven schools in the district—including four elementary schools, a middle school, a senior high school, and a residential alternative high school.

History

Schools
Elementary schools:
Margaretta Carey Elementary School (K–4), Waverly
Shell Rock Elementary School (K–4), Shell Rock
Southeast Elementary School (K-4), Waverly
West Cedar Elementary School (K–4), Waverly

Middle schools:
Waverly-Shell Rock Middle School (5–8), Waverly

High schools:
Waverly-Shell Rock Senior High School (9-12), Waverly
Waverly-Shell Rock Lied Center (residential 10–12), Waverly

Enrollment

See also
List of school districts in Iowa

References

External links
Waverly-Shell Rock Community School District

School districts in Iowa
Education in Bremer County, Iowa
Education in Butler County, Iowa
Waverly, Iowa